Gianfranco Battisti (Fiuggi, 19 January 1962) is an Italian corporate executive. Since 31 July 2018, he has been chief executive officer and general manager of Ferrovie dello Stato Italiane S.p.A.

Education 
Battisti has a degree in Political Science and International Economics and Management.

Career 
Gianfranco Battisti began his career in 1988 with Fiat S.p.A. in marketing management.

Ten years later, he joined Ferrovie dello Stato Italiane S.p.A. as head of marketing and revenue management for night trains, eventually coming to fill roles of increasing importance such as marketing director.

As of 2009, Battisti held the roles of director of the company Artesia S.p.A (until 2011) and director of the national and international passenger division along with that of high speed for Trenitalia (until 2017). During the same year, Gianfranco Battisti led the process that brought 10 million passengers to high speed, for which he also received the Global Award WTM (World Travel Market).

From 2017 to October 2018, he was chief executive officer of FS Sistemi Urbani.

In July 2018, Battisti was appointed chief executive officer and general manager of Ferrovie dello Stato Italiane S.p.A.

Since 31 July 2019, he has been chairman of the FS Foundation.

In March 2020, he presented the 2019 FS Italiane Group financial results, with more than 12 billion euro in revenues and 584 million in net profit, recording the best business result to date.

Other roles covered 
He is a member of the management committee of Community of European Railway and Infrastructure Companies (CER).
In October 2019, Battisti also joined the CEO’s Call to Action, the appeal for sustainable development launched by the international network CSR Europe to business leaders. He was also appointed ambassador for promoting diversity in the transport sector. From July 2017 to May 2020, Battisti served as national president of Federturismo, a Confindustria federation that unites companies in the sector at a national and international level. He is part of both the committee of reference for the European University of Rome, and the management committee of the Associazione Nazionale Onlus Incontradonna which deals with the prevention of breast cancer.

Acknowledgements 
In London in 2009, he was awarded the Global Award WTM (World Travel Market) for the development of the high speed business in Italy.

Honours
Commander of the Order of Merit of the Italian Republic (Commendatore Ordine al Merito della Repubblica Italiana)

Knight of the Order of Merit of The Italian Republic (Cavaliere Ordine al Merito della Repubblica Italiana)

References

1962 births
Living people
Italian chief executives
Ferrovie dello Stato Italiane people